The rice moth (Corcyra cephalonica) is a moth of the family Pyralidae. This small moth can become a significant pest. Its caterpillars feed on dry plantstuffs such as seeds, including cereals (e.g. rice). Other recorded foods are flour and dried fruits.

Synonyms
Other scientific names, now invalid, for the rice moth are:
 Anerastia lineata Legrand, 1965
 Corcyra translineella Hampson, 1901
 Melissoblaptes cephalonica Stainton, 1866
 Melissoblaptes oeconomellus Mann, 1872
 Tineopsis theobromae Dyar, 1913

When describing his T. theobromae in 1913, Dyar established the genus Tineopsis. He overlooked, however, that this had already been proposed by Cajetan Freiherr von Felder for a (presumed) arctiid moth in 1861. Nonwithstanding that Felder's species is somewhat dubious and has not been identified in recent lists, Dyar's Tineopsis is a junior homonym and thus invalid in any case.

The species of the genus Corcyra have recently been considered members of the genus Aphomia by some researchers.

See also
 Corcyra
 Aphomia

Footnotes

References 
  (1942): Eigenartige Geschmacksrichtungen bei Kleinschmetterlingsraupen ["Strange tastes among micromoth caterpillars"]. Zeitschrift des Wiener Entomologen-Vereins 27: 105–109 [in German]. PDF fulltext
  (2009): Markku Savela's Lepidoptera and some other life forms – Corcyra. Version of 2009-APR-07. Retrieved 2010-APR-10.

Moths described in 1866
Tirathabini
Agricultural pest insects
Moths of Madagascar
Moths of Japan
Moths of Europe
Moths of Réunion
Moths of Asia
Moths of Africa